Premonition is the second album by American rock band Survivor, released in October 1981 in the United States and February 1982 elsewhere. It was the first album to use the Survivor script logo.

The album, along with many other Survivor albums, was briefly taken out of print in 2009, but was remastered and reissued the following year and distributed by Rock Candy Records. The album includes the singles "Poor Man's Son" (#33, US Chart), one of the songs that would be part of their live set list, and "Summer Nights" (#62, US Chart). A song named Missing Persons was recorded for the album but left out from the final cut.

Track listing
All tracks written by Jim Peterik and Frankie Sullivan, except where noted.

Personnel 
Survivor
 Dave Bickler – lead vocals, synthesizers
 Jim Peterik – keyboards, guitars, backing vocals
 Frankie Sullivan – lead guitars, backing vocals
 Stephan Ellis – bass
 Marc Droubay – drums

Additional musicians
 Daryl Dragon – additional keyboards

Production 
 Jim Peterik – producer
 Frankie Sullivan – producer
 Artie Kornfeld – co-producer (1, 2), production assistant 
 Artie Ripp – co-producer (1, 2)
 Phil Bonanno – production assistant, engineer, mixing 
 Brad Cicotti – engineer
 Les Cooper – engineer
 Doug Sax – mastering 
 Michael Kevin Lee – art direction, design, graphics
 Veronica Sim – photography

Studios
 Recorded at Rumbo Recorders (Los Angeles, California).
 Mixed at Fidelity Studios (North Hollywood, California).
 Mastered at The Mastering Lab (Hollywood, California).

Notes

1981 albums
Survivor (band) albums
Scotti Brothers Records albums